The Chinese Enterprise Archery League(CEAL) is a Taiwanese archery league founded in 2019.

History
The CEAL was founded by Chinese Taipei Archery Association in 2019. The six teams participating in the inaugural season are Caesar Park, CTAA Youth Team, Hsinchu City JSL Group, My Humble House Group, Taichung Bank Eagles, and Tainan Archery Team. The first edition CEAL draft was held on March 6, 2019, at Sheraton Hotel Taipei.

In 2022, Chang Hwa Bank joined as the seventh CEAL team.

Format
Each game is played for five matches. The matches play in the order as women's individual, men's individual, mixed doubles, women's team, and men's team. Points are awarded to the winning team for each match. Each player can participate no more than two matches in all games.

The playoff games qualification is based on the total points of the regular season.

Teams

Timeline

Draft
In the first two seasons, men and women draftees were drafted respectively. Since 2021, men and women draftees were selected in a same draft.

Champions

Awards

References

Professional sports leagues in Taiwan
2019 establishments in Taiwan
Sports leagues established in 2019